Nes og Hitterø or Hitterø og Nes is a former municipality that was located in the old Vest-Agder county in Norway. It was located in the southwestern part of the present-day municipality of Flekkefjord in Agder county. It encompassed the Nes peninsula and the island of Hidra (formerly called Hitterø). The  municipality existed from 1838 until its dissolution in 1893. The administrative centre of the municipality was the small village of Sunde in Nes parish, located just outside the town of Flekkefjord (which was its own separate municipality).

Name
The municipality was originally named Flekkefjord landdistrikt because it was the rural area surrounding the town of Flekkefjord. In 1864, the municipal name was changed to Nes og Hitterø. The new name is a combination of the names of the two parishes in the municipality: Nes and Hitterø. Nes is named after the old Nes farm where the town of Flekkefjord now stands. The name is identical with the word nes which means "peninsula", since Nes is located on a peninsula. The other name, Hitterø, comes from the name of the island of Hitterø and it surrounding parish. The name Hitterø was later changed to Hidra due to Norwegian spelling reforms.

History
The municipality of Flekkefjord landdistrikt was established on 1 January 1838 (see formannskapsdistrikt law). According to the 1835 census, the municipality had a population of 3,155. The name was changed to Nes og Hitterø in 1864. On 8 October 1893, Nes og Hitterø was divided to create two new municipalities: Nes (population: 1,704) and Hitterø (population: 2,075). These two municipalities were later merged into the municipality of Flekkefjord during the 1960s.

See also
List of former municipalities of Norway

References

External links

Flekkefjord
Former municipalities of Norway
1838 establishments in Norway
1893 disestablishments in Norway